"Mr. Teddy Bear" is the first episode of the second series of the 1960s cult British spy-fi television series The Avengers, starring Patrick Macnee and Honor Blackman. It was first broadcast by ABC on 29 September 1962. The episode was directed by Richmond Harding and written by Martin Woodhouse.

Plot
Steed and Cathy must track down an elusive assassin nicknamed Mr. Teddy Bear.

Cast
 Patrick Macnee as John Steed
 Honor Blackman as Cathy Gale
 Douglas Muir as One Ten 
 Bernard Goldman as Mr. Teddy Bear's voice
 Tim Brinton as TV Interviewer
 Kenneth Keeling as Colonel Vernon Wayne-Gilley
 John Horsley as Dr. Gilmore
 John Ruddock as Dr. James Howell     
 Michael Robbins as Henry Farrow   
 Michael Collins as George, the Technician/Teddy Bruin
 Sarah Maxwell as Blonde Cafe Girl

References

External links

Episode overview on The Avengers Forever! website

The Avengers (season 2) episodes
1962 British television episodes